The Clipper Schooner is a public house at 19 Friars Lane, Great Yarmouth, in England. It was designed by A. W. Ecclestone in 1938 for Lacons brewers, for whom Ecclestone was the chief surveyor. It has a decorative tiled panel showing a sailing ship that the Tile Gazetteer describe as typical of Ecclestone's practice in his modern pub designs.

The current building replaced an earlier Lacons pub that dated from the mid-nineteenth century.

See also
 Iron Duke also designed by Ecclestone

References

External links 
 http://www.norfolkpubs.co.uk/gtyarmouth/gyc/gyccls.htm
 http://www.greatyarmouthmercury.co.uk/news/an-admiral-was-among-the-borough-s-quay-residents-1-4699442

Buildings and structures completed in 1938
Pubs in Norfolk
Streamline Moderne architecture in the United Kingdom
Great Yarmouth